Uruguay competed in the Summer Olympic Games for the first time at the 1924 Summer Olympics in Paris, France.

Medalists

Gold
 José Andrade, Pedro Arispe, Pedro Casella, Pedro Cea, Luis Chiappara, Pedro Etchegoyen, Alfredo Ghierra, Andrés Mazali, José Nasazzi, José Naya, Pedro Petrone, Ángel Romano, Zoilo Saldombide, Héctor Scarone, Pascual Somma, Humberto Tomassina, Antonio Urdinarán, Santos Urdinarán, Fermín Uriarte, José Vidal, Alfredo J. Zibechi, and Pedro Zingone — Football, Men's Team Competition

Results by event

Boxing 

Five boxers represented Uruguay at the 1924 Games. It was the nation's debut in the sport as well as the Games. Nicolares was the only Uruguayan boxer to win a bout, reaching the second round before being defeated. Smoris also reached the second round via bye before losing his first bout.

Fencing

Six fencers, all men, represented Uruguay in 1924. It was the nation's debut in the sport as well as the Games.

 Men

Ranks given are within the pool.

Football

Uruguay competed in the Olympic football tournament for the first time in 1924, winning the first of back-to-back gold medals.

 Round 1

 Round 2

 Quarterfinals

 Semifinals

 Final

Final rank 

 Roster
José Andrade
Pedro Arispe
Pedro Casella
Pedro Cea
Luis Chiappara
Pedro Etchegoyen
Alfredo Ghierra
Andrés Mazali
José Nasazzi
José Naya
Pedro Petrone
Ángel Romano
Zoilo Saldombide
Héctor Scarone
Pascual Somma
Humberto Tomassina
Antonio Urdinarán
Santos Urdinarán
Fermín Uriarte
José Vidal
Alfredo J. Zibechi
Pedro Zignone

References
Montevideo.com
Official Olympic Reports
International Olympic Committee results database

Nations at the 1924 Summer Olympics
1924
1924 in Uruguayan sport